Oxolinic acid is a quinolone antibiotic developed in Japan in the 1970s. Dosages 12–20 mg/kg orally administered for five to ten days.  The antibiotic works by inhibiting the enzyme DNA gyrase. It also acts as a dopamine reuptake inhibitor and has stimulant effects in mice.

See also
 Amfonelic acid
 Fluoroquinolone

References

Quinolone antibiotics
Dopamine reuptake inhibitors
Carboxylic acids
Nitrogen heterocycles
Oxygen heterocycles
Heterocyclic compounds with 3 rings